Biejjenniejte ("Daughter of the Sun") was a deity of the Sami mythology. 

She is the goddess of medicine and healing. She is the daughter of the sun goddess Beaivi. She is particularly helpful towards illnesses caused by her mother, the Sun.

Notes

References

Sámi goddesses
Health goddesses